Leigh Ann Fetter (born May 23, 1969), later known by her married name Leigh Ann Witt, is an American former competition swimmer who represented the United States at the 1988 Summer Olympics in Seoul, South Korea.  She finished fifth in the final of the women's 50-meter freestyle in a time of 25.78 seconds.

Fetter attended the University of Texas at Austin, and swam for the Texas Longhorns swimming and diving team in National Collegiate Athletic Association (NCAA) competition from 1987 to 1991.  She was the first woman to ever swim the 50-yard freestyle in under 22 seconds, and won the NCAA individual national championship in the event four consecutive years.  She was also a key points contributor to the Lady Longhorns' NCAA national team championships in 1988, 1990 and 1991, and received the Honda Sports Award for Swimming and Diving, recognizing her as the outstanding college female swimmer of the year in 1990–91.  She was inducted into the university's Longhorn Hall of Honor in 2003.

See also
 List of University of Texas at Austin alumni
 List of World Aquatics Championships medalists in swimming (women)

References

1969 births
Living people
American female freestyle swimmers
Olympic swimmers of the United States
Sacred Heart Academy (Louisville) alumni
Swimmers at the 1988 Summer Olympics
Texas Longhorns women's swimmers
Sportspeople from Louisville, Kentucky
World Aquatics Championships medalists in swimming